5284 Orsilocus  is a Jupiter trojan from the Greek camp, approximately  in diameter. It was discovered on 1 February 1989, by American astronomers Carolyn and Eugene Shoemaker at the Palomar Observatory in California. The D-type asteroid belongs the 100 largest Jupiter trojans and has a rotation period of 10.3 hours. It was named after the hero Orsilochus (Orsilocus) from Greek mythology.

Orbit and classification 

Orsilocus is a dark Jovian asteroid orbiting in the leading Greek camp at Jupiter's  Lagrangian point, 60° ahead of the Gas Giant's orbit in a 1:1 resonance . It is also a non-family asteroid in the Jovian background population.

It orbits the Sun at a distance of 4.8–5.7 AU once every 11 years and 11 months (4,364 days; semi-major axis of 5.23 AU). Its orbit has an eccentricity of 0.08 and an inclination of 20° with respect to the ecliptic. The body's observation arc begins with a precovery at Palomar in February 1953, or 36 years prior to its official discovery observation.

Physical characteristics 

In the SDSS-based taxonomy, Orsilocus is a D-type asteroid, the most common spectral type among the larger Jupiter trojans. It has also been characterized as a D-type by Pan-STARRS' survey, while the Collaborative Asteroid Lightcurve Link (CALL) assumes it to be a carbonaceous C-type asteroid. Its V–I color index of 0.97 is typical for most larger Jovian asteroids.

Rotation period 

In February 2013, a rotational lightcurve of Orsilocus was obtained from photometric observations by Robert Stephens at the Center for Solar System Studies (CS3) in Landers, California. Lightcurve analysis gave a rotation period of  hours with a variation amplitude of 0.12 magnitude.

Diameter and albedo 

According to the survey carried out by the NEOWISE mission of NASA's Wide-field Infrared Survey Explorer, Orsilocus measures 50.16 kilometers in diameter and its surface has an albedo of 0.070, while CALL assumes a standard albedo for a carbonaceous asteroid of 0.057, and calculates a diameter of 53.16 kilometers based on an absolute magnitude of 10.1.

Naming 

This minor planet was named from Greek mythology after Orsilochus, son of Diocles (Diokles) and twin brother of Crethon (see 5285 Krethon). The Achaean warrior fought under Agamemnon and Menelaus in the Trojan War, where he was slain by Aeneas. The official naming citation was published by the Minor Planet Center on 12 July 1995.

Notes

References

External links 
 Asteroid Lightcurve Database (LCDB), query form (info )
 Dictionary of Minor Planet Names, Google books
 Discovery Circumstances: Numbered Minor Planets (5001)-(10000) – Minor Planet Center
 
 

005284
Discoveries by Carolyn S. Shoemaker
Discoveries by Eugene Merle Shoemaker
Named minor planets
19890201